Joey Groenbast (born 4 May 1995) is a Dutch footballer who plays as a right-back for Derde Divisie club OFC Oostzaan. Groenbast is of Surinamese descent.

Career
In June 2021, Groenbast joined Derde Divisie club OFC Oostzaan.

References

External links
 
 

1995 births
Living people
Footballers from Zoetermeer
Association football fullbacks
Dutch footballers
Dutch expatriate footballers
Dutch sportspeople of Surinamese descent
Feyenoord players
Sparta Rotterdam players
Go Ahead Eagles players
Sutherland Sharks FC players
OFC Oostzaan players
Eredivisie players
Eerste Divisie players
Derde Divisie players
Dutch expatriate sportspeople in Australia
Expatriate soccer players in Australia